Hyosus was an extinct genus of even-toed ungulates that existed in India.

References

Prehistoric Suidae
Fossil taxa described in 1926
Prehistoric even-toed ungulate genera